The Diamond is the main square in Donegal Town. It forms the town centre with an extensive pedestrian area with seating and trees. It includes a prominent 'obelisk' celebrating 'the Four Masters', four Gaelic historians led by Brother Mícheál Ó Cléirigh who wrote The Annals of the Four Masters in the 1630s. The Plantation of Ulster and the establishment of 'plantation towns' often included a meeting area or market place (often with a 'mercat cross') in the town centre.

Further reading
 Prof. Alistair Rowan, The Buildings of Ireland: North West Ulster (better known as the Pevsner Guide to North West Ulster). Penguin, London, 1979.

Donegal (town)
Roads in County Donegal
Squares in the Republic of Ireland
Tourist attractions in County Donegal